The PIK-15 Hinu was a light aircraft developed in Finland in the 1960s for use as a glider tug. It was a low-wing cantilever monoplane of conventional design with an enclosed cockpit and fixed, tailwheel undercarriage. The cockpit had two seats, side-by-side, and the PIK-15 was intended to have a secondary role as a trainer. Construction was of wood throughout.

Design work began in 1960, with the first prototype built two years later and flying on 29 August 1964. Six examples were listed on the Finnish Civil Aviation Authority registry in 2011.

Specifications (prototype, with low-pitch propeller)

Notes

References
 
 
 
 
 
 

1960s Finnish special-purpose aircraft
PIK aircraft
Glider tugs
Single-engined tractor aircraft
Low-wing aircraft
Aircraft first flown in 1964